The Golden Root or The Golden Trunk (Italian: Lo turzo d'oro) is a literary fairy tale written by Giambattista Basile in the Pentamerone, as the fourth story of the fifth day. 

The tale is related to the international cycle of the Search for the Lost Husband, where a heroine loses her husband and must search for him.

Summary

The tale focuses on Parmetella, a poor girl and youngest of three sisters: she, Pascuzza and Cice. They are daughters of a gardener, who gives them pigs to rear in hopes of getting a future dowry. Her sisters often force Parmetella to drive the pigs in another part of the meadow, where she eventually finds a fountain and a tree with golden leaves beside it. She collects some foliage and gives the to her father who sells them as she returns. She repeats the action until the tree is stripped bare of its foliage.

Some time later, Parmetella notices that the golden-leaved tree has a golden root. She takes an axe to the root and finds a staircase leading underground. She descends on the hole where the tree trunk once stood and reaches a luxurious palace. She wanders through the palace and marvels at its sights, until she sees a table with food and drink. As she approaches the table, a Moorish slave appears before her and asks her to be his wife. She accepts the proposal before the slave tells her that she must promise never to light a lamp during the night, to which she consents.

The next night however, Parmetella waits until her mysterious companion is asleep, and lights a candle out of curiosity. She sees a handsome man in the place of her companion. The man wakes up, curses her for not obeying his orders and vanishes. Parmetella leaves the palace and meets a fairy, who gives her seven spindles, seven figs, a jar of honey, and seven pairs of iron shoes. She instructs her to keep walking until she meets seven bone-eating ogresses, and to use the gifts she received to lure them.

Parmetella soon finds the house of the ogresses and convinces them to swear on her husband's name, Truone-e-lampe ("Thunder-and-Lightning"), not to harm her by using the gifts and instructions of the fairy. Later, their ogress mother appears before Parmetella forces her to swear on her son's name not to harm her. The ogress complies.

The ogress mother orders Parmetella, as a first task, to separate twelve sacks of grains that have been mixed into a single heap. Her husband, Truone-e-lampe, appears again before her and summons an army of ants to use to separate the grains, helping her in the process. As a second task, the ogress demands that she fills a dozen mattresses with feathers, which she also accomplishes with her husband's advice: she spreads the mattresses on the ground and shouts that the king of the birds is dead, and all the birds appear to give her some of their feathers.

The last task given to her is to go to the ogress' sister's house and fetch a box of instruments from her, to be used in the future wedding of Truone-e-lampe with another wife. Following her husband's advice, she enters the sister's house, gives food to the horse and the dog, and compliments the door hinges. She then tricks the ogress's niece who goes with her into the oven instead of her, takes the box of instruments before the witch commands the door hinges, the horse and the dog to stop her. Parmetella, however, leaves unscathed due to her previous actions. At a safe distance from the witch, curiosity takes the best of her again as she opens the box; causing musical instruments to fly out in process. Truone-e-lampe fortunately reappears before her and, with a whistle, commands the instruments back into the box.

Finally, the ogress mother prepares her son's wedding: she gives a torch to each of her seven daughters, and two to Parmetella to hold, and places her near a well so that, when she falls asleep, she may fall into it. Truone-e-lampe's ugly bride passes by Parmetella and mocks her for not kissing the bridegroom after claiming she has kissed a herdsman for some chestnuts. Truone-e-lampe overhears the bride's confession and fumes silently. After the wedding party is over, in his nuptial chambers, Truone-e-lampe kills his bride.

The ogress mother later sees her son in Parmetella's arms. Infuriated, she decides to conspire with her sister to get rid of her. When she enters her sister's house, the ogress discovers that, out of grief for losing her baby, her sister has jumped into the oven to die alongside her. The ogress turns into a ram and butts its head against the wall, leaving her fate unknown. Truone-e-lampe and Parmetella ultimately make peace with their sisters-in-law and live happily.

Analysis

Tale type
The tale is often classified in the Aarne-Thompson-Uther Index as belonging to type ATU 425, "The Search for the Lost Husband". Nancy Canepa indexes it as type 425A, "The Animal as Bridegroom".

Scholars have called attention to structural similarities between the tale and the Graeco-Roman myth of Cupid and Psyche, as related by Apuleius in the 2nd century AD. In fact, The Golden Root is considered to be one of Basile's renditions of the myth, the other being Il catenaccio ("The Padlock", former tale type AaTh 425L, "The Padlock on the Enchanted Husband"). Folklorist Joseph Jacobs stated that The Golden Root is the first appearance in modern times of the "Cupid and Psyche story" (invisible husband, breaking a taboo, heroine's tasks for mother-in-law).

Motifs

Scholars commonly noticed the resemblance between Parmetella's quest for the box of instruments and Psyche's quest for Persephone's casket, and the result of curiosity for both women. Catalan scholarship located the motif of the box of musical instruments in Greek, Turkish and South Italian variants.

The heroine is also helped by ants to carry grains from one place to the other. A similar event occurs in the myth of Psyche and in other fairy tales, such as The Queen Bee, by the Brothers Grimm. Swedish scholar  remarked that, in tales of "The Search for the Lost Husband" type, the task of sorting seeds or grains occurs in Mediterranean and Near Eastern variants of type ATU 425B, "The Witch's Tasks".

Variants

Italy

In a Sicilian variant collected by Laura Gonzenbach, Der Kônig Stieglitz ("King Goldfinch"), a poor shoemaker sits on a rock to lament his lack of work and suddenly a youth appears, named Cardiddu, saying that the shoemaker called out his name. The youth guides the shoemaker to his rich underground palace and lets him take some riches with him. The youth tells him that he is  wants to marry the shoemaker's third and youngest daughter. The shoemaker agrees and returns home to explain the situation to his daughters. The third one marries the mysterious prince and they live a good life, but her husband orders her not to open a certain door. He explains that he was a king, banished to this underground castle by  mamma draja, a witch who wants him to marry her daughter. King Cardiddu leaves for some days and his wife is visited by her sisters. They try to convince their sister to open the door, but she refuses. One night, spurred by curiosity, she lights a candle to see if her husband was asleep. One drop of wax falls on his head and she finds herself out in the forest, the castle having disappeared. King Cardiddu admonishes her and tells her to follow the trail to the witch who enchanted him, and make her swear on his name to avoid being eaten by her. She does as instructed and the witch takes her as her servant. The witch forces her to do difficult tasks, which she accomplishes with her husband's help. The last task by the witch is for her to take a letter and a box to her sister, also a witch. On her way, curiosity gets the better of her and she opens the box, which begins to ring. Her husband appears and silences it. She delivers the box to the witch and returns to the mamma draja, who has made the preparations for the marriage between her daughter and King Cardiddu. The woman is to hold burning candles at the foot of the bridal bed during the nuptial night, but King Cardiddu knows it is a trap, so he makes the mamma draja's daughter change places with the woman. The witch's daughter falls into the trap and the couple escape from the house by transforming into different things - a sequence that appears in tale type ATU 313, "The Magic Flight". Scholar Jack Zipes translated the tale as King Cardiddu and classified it as type ATU 425A, "The Animal as Bridegroom", with an episode of type 313, "The Girl as Helper in the Hero's Flight".

In another Sicilian variant, collected by Giuseppe Pitrè with the title Marvizia, a prince's daughter owns a potted plant that produces a rose with good seeds to eat. A green bird comes and eats the seeds. The girl wants to own this green bird, but the prince's servants fail to catch it. Then, she dons a disguise as a pilgrim and follows the bird to various villages, under the pretense that she is going on a seven year penance. She arrives at a city whose queen misses her son. The queen soon shelters the girl. In return, the girl asks for the queen's ring, a memento of her lost son, as an attempt to reassure her. The queen agrees and the girl pilgrim continues on her journey. She arrives at the house of a mammadraga and asks for lodging. The mammadraga invites her in, calls her Marvizia (from Marva, a mallow plant) and sets her to doing strenuous tasks. First, the girl, Marvizia, has to clean all copper utensils, and confides to the mammadraga's giant servant, Ali. The green bird appears on the window sill and advises the girl. Next, to wash all the mattresses, and finally to weave clothes for the mammadraga. The next day, the mammadraga turns the green bird into a man, and sets her giant servant Ali to take Marvizia to be devoured by goats. Ali meets the green bird, who gives him a magic staff to create grass to satiate the goats. A shepherd girl gives food to mammadraga, who, after thanking her, decides to make the girl her daughter-in-law. The green bird agrees to the mammadraga's decision, but secretly, uses the Ring of Command to materialize a torch with gunpowder and pellets inside. After their marriage, with Marvizia holding the torch on the foot of the bridal bed, the green bird asks for his new wife to hold the torch. The torch explodes on the shepherdess's hands, taking the mammadraga's house with it. Marvizia, the now human green bird and the giant soon attempt to escape from the mammadraga with the Ring and the Book of Command, with the villainess hot in pursuit.  The trio eventually escape and meet with the queen who gave Marvizia the ring. Author  translated the tale as Pappelröschen ("Poplar Rose"), and commented that this was another variant of the myth of Cupid and Psyche. Ruth Manning-Sanders translated the tale as The Green Bird in her work A Book of Ogres and Trolls.

In a variant from Tuscany, Ermenegilda e Cupido, collected from a Rosina Casina, Ermenegilda is the youngest of three sisters. One day, she enters a palace and, after some wandering, reaches a door that says it is her room. She lives with a mysterious character that comes at night to her bed. She suspects it might be a monster, so the next time he comes, she will light a candle to see him. So she does, and sees a handsome youth. He awakes and tells her he feels betrayed, and that she must seek his mother, a sorceress. Ermenegilda meets her mother-in-law, who discovers she married her son, so she sends her on difficult tasks: to wash a bicoloured piece of cloth to all white, to separate many feathers, and to carry a letter to the sorceress's sister and get from her "i canti, i balli e soni". After getting the box, Ermenegilda opens it: little men and little women escape from it and begin to dance, sing and play, but Cupido brings them back to the box. Finally, the sorceress forces Ermenegilda to carry ten candles, one on each finger, to her son's wedding to another woman.

Author Heinrich Zschalig published a tale from the island of Capri with the title Blitz und Donner ("Thunder and Lightning"): a girl named Rosinella lives with her poor father. One day, she takes her pig to graze in the forest and finds a tree with golden leaves and golden branches. She takes some foliage to her father. They eventually revisits the forest on the next day before they see the tree tumbling down. After the tree falls, they see a staircase leading underground. Her father is reluctant to go down the stairs, but Rosinella soon climbs down the hole and finds a large underground palace. In one of the chambers, Rosinella meets a shadowed being and offers her services to it. The shadow agrees and lets her stay, as long as she does not enter his bedchambers neither during the day nor at night. She obeys his instructions from one year, until she enters his chambers and sees a beautiful youth asleep on the bed. The next morning, the shadowed man reproaches Rosinella, but gives her iron shoes and some figs. He explains that the figs are for his sisters, and that, if she suffers for a year, three months and three weeks, the man, named Thunder and Lightning, will marry her. Rosinella goes to the city and reaches a terrace where the three sisters are and gives them the figs. The sisters welcome her, but warn that their mother, Luisa, is a cannibal and may devour her, but the girl can gain her favour by pulling her hair and forcing her to swear on her son's name. Luisa appears and smells Rosinella's "Christian flesh". Rosinella forces Luisa not to harm her on her son's name. Luisa forces the human girl on difficult tasks: to fill two sacks with feathers and to separate a large heap of mixed seeds. Thunder and Lightning helps her: he summons all birds to give their feathers and an army of ants to separate the seeds. Next, Luisa sends Rosinella to her sister, also a cannibal, with a letter and an order to get a casket from a cabinet. On the way there, the man reappears and tells her that the task is a trap; he gives her a bag full of oatmeal and biscuits, and instructs her to give the oatmeal to the horse and the biscuits to the parrot, get the casket and escape. Rosinella gets the item and, on the way back, opens it, and a flock of birds escapes. The same man uses his magic powers to draw the birds back to the casket. Lastly, Luisa arranges her son's wedding to an ugly woman. Before the ceremony, Thunder and Lightning asks Rosinella for a kiss, but she refuses. The ugly bride confesses that she kissed a pigherder for three nuts. Thunder and Lightning scolds the ugly bride and chooses Rosinella. Luisa, his mother, tired of her defeats, jumps into a well.

In a variant from Toscana translated by German scholar  with the title Cristina und das Ungeheuer ("Cristina and the Monster"), a mother has three daughters of marriageable age; the youngest, Cristina, is the prettiest of the three, but finds no adequate suitor. One day, the mother consults a magician to learn her youngest daughter's fate. The magician answers that her fate will be the most fortunate of the three sisters, and suggests to take Cristina for a stroll in the mountains, lace her food with opium and, after the girl falls asleep, leave her there and return home which she follows soon after. Cristina eventually wakes up and finds herself in a grand palace, and a voice tells her that the palace and everything in it belongs to her. Time passes, and she wants to visit her family. The voice gives her a magic ring, and warns her not to tell her mother or her sisters about her life. Cristina's mother consults with the magician and learns her daughter is living a life of luxury in the palace of a prince named Cupido, changed into a monster by the work of a Maga (sorceress). Cristina breaks the voice's trust: she lights a candle at night and sees not a monstruous form, but a handsome youth with wings on his shoulders. A bit of wax burns his chest, he wakes up, curses Cristina and disappears. She now has to do penance, so she finds work with the Ungeheuer ("Monster"). The first task given to Cristina is for her is to clear away a mountain top; then to get an egg from its depths. She is soon instructed to go to another mountain filled with tigers and find enough hides to sew a pair of gloves. Cristina's last task is for her to go to hell and get a box from the Devil, without opening it. Cristina gets a box from the devil and stops a bit on the way; she opens the box and a dark fog comes out of it and covers the world in darkness. In this tale, the heroine's helper is an old lady: she waves her wand and the darkness goes back to the box.

 summarized a tale from Abruzzo named Lu fatte de Ggijje-me’-bbèlle. In this tale, a woman has a son and a step-daughter. Disliking her step-daughter, the woman forces the girl on impossible tasks. The woman's son, named Ggijje-me’-bbèlle, offers his help to the girl, his step-sister, in exchange for a kiss. One day, the woman sends her step-daughter to get the scàttele de le sunarjielle, and Ggijje-me’-bbèlle advises the girl on how to reach it. Eventually, the woman marries her son to another bride, and forces the step-daughter to hold ten candles on her fingers during the wedding night. The girl bears the burning, and Ggijje-me’-bbèlle wishes to help her. Ggijje-me’-bbèlle's bride mocks the girl's suffering and confesses that she kissed the hands of the milkman for some figs and a glass of milk. Ggijje-me’-bbèlle kills the bride and eventually marries his step-sister.

See also
 The King of Love
 Prince Wolf (Danish fairy tale)
 Tulisa, the Wood-Cutter's Daughter (Indian fairy tale)
 The Horse-Devil and the Witch
 Graciosa and Percinet (French literary tale)
 Habrmani
 Khastakhumar and Bibinagar
 Yasmin and the Serpent Prince
Amewakahiko soshi

References

Further reading 
 Maggi, Armando. 'Orpheus, the King of the Birds, Moves to Sicily with Cupid and Psyche: Laura Gonzenbach’s “King Cardiddu”'. In: Preserving the Spell: Basile's "The Tale of Tales" and Its Afterlife in the Fairy-Tale Tradition. Chicago, IL, 2015; online edn, Chicago Scholarship Online, 21 Jan. 2016. . Accessed 22 Feb. 2023.

External links
 The Golden Root at Wikisource.

Italian fairy tales
ATU 400-459

de:Der goldene Stamm